Agganis Arena is a 7,200-seat multi-purpose arena in Boston, Massachusetts, United States, on the campus of Boston University, built on the location of the former Commonwealth Armory. It is home to the five-time national champion Boston University Terriers men's ice hockey team. It is named after Harry Agganis, an outstanding football and baseball athlete for BU and the Boston Red Sox, who died at the age of 26 from a massive pulmonary embolism. A life-size bronze statue of Agganis sculpted by Armand LaMontagne stands outside the arena at the corner of Commonwealth Avenue and Harry Agganis Way. The hockey rink is named Jack Parker Rink, after the legendary BU hockey player and coach. The arena is part of Boston University's John Hancock Student Village, which also includes dormitories and the university's five-story Fitness and Recreation Center.

Agganis was dedicated in 2004 and hosted its first event in 2005. It replaced Walter Brown Arena, located at the Case Athletic Center, as the home of BU Men's Ice Hockey, though Walter Brown Arena is still in use as the home of BU Women's Ice Hockey. 

In the arena's first decade, Boston University basketball played select home games at Agganis, with the remainder being played at Case Gym. The school made the decision before the 2015-2016 season to move all home games back to Case Gym due to poor attendance at Agganis. The last BU basketball game played at Agganis was a 77-70 loss to rival Holy Cross on Feb. 28, 2015.

It serves as a regional auditorium for large events, including concerts, ceremonies of other schools such as Berklee College of Music, musicals, awareness events, and appearances by speakers such as Barack Obama and Dave Chappelle.

Since 2008, Agganis has hosted the annual CRASH-B World Indoor Rowing Championship.

Tournaments

America East Basketball
It hosted the first rounds of the 2007 America East men's basketball tournament and the finals in 2011.

NCAA Frozen Four
Agganis Arena also hosted the 2009 Women's Frozen Four. The venue was also selected to host the 2020 Women's Frozen Four before the tournament was cancelled due to the COVID-19 pandemic.

Other events
The arena hosted TNA Wrestling's anniversary show Slammiversary on June 2, 2013.

In January 2018, the arena hosted the playoff stage for the ELEAGUE Major tournament for Counter-Strike: Global Offensive. It was the first time in the game's history that a North American team (Cloud9) won a major-level tournament.

On October 9, 2019, professional wrestling promotion All Elite Wrestling (AEW) held the second episode of its live weekly television show AEW Dynamite at the arena. AEW returned to the Agganis Arena for its October 27, 2021 episode of Dynamite. That week's episode of AEW Rampage was also taped at the arena following the Dynamite taping. AEW returned once again on April 6, 2022 for a live episode of Dynamite, as well as tapings of AEW Rampage and AEW Dark: Elevation.

See also
 List of NCAA Division I basketball arenas

References

External links
Arena's website
Boston University Department of Athletics Facilities

College ice hockey venues in the United States
College basketball venues in the United States
Sports venues in Boston
Boston University Terriers sports venues
Boston University Terriers men's basketball
Boston University Terriers men's ice hockey